Jabboana is a town of Jhang District in the Punjab province of Pakistan, near the bank of the Jhelum River. It is named after Jabboana, a sub-clan of Sial tribe, who are affiliated with agriculture and politics of the area. It resides in the union counsel of  jabboana earlier it was under coat murad. It has population of around 10,000 and area of 20,000 square feet. The 
Sial tribe has different sub tribes such as Jabboana Fatiana Soi Sial and other ones which are associated with different cultural and social businesses.

References

Populated places in Jhang District
Jhang District